From Prada to Nada is a 2011 American romantic comedy film directed by Angel Gracia, loosely based on Jane Austen's 1811 novel Sense and Sensibility. The screenplay was adapted by Fina Torres, Luis Alfaro, and Craig Fernandez to be a Latino version of the English novel, where two spoiled sisters who have been left penniless after their father's sudden death are forced to move in with their estranged aunt in East Los Angeles.

The film received a limited release in the United States on January 28, 2011, by Pantelion Films (a joint venture of Televisa and Lionsgate). In the United States, it grossed $4 million theatrically; the box office result met Pantelion's expectation.

Plot
At the reading of their father's will, wealthy sisters Nora and Mary discover that they are bankrupt and are forced to sell their house to their half-brother Gabe Hernandez, who lets them live with him and his wife, Olivia. After Olivia tries to move them into the basement, the girls leave the house and move in with their maternal aunt, Aurelia, in East Los Angeles. Nora quits law school and finds a job as a legal clerk to help support herself and Mary. Mary returns to college, where she meets and flirts with rich instructor Rodrigo while being admired from afar by Aurelia's neighbor Bruno. Nora arrives at her new job and learns that her boss is Olivia's brother Edward, who she falls in love with.

The bulk of the film consists of a series of romantic escapades between the girls and their boyfriends, set against the backdrop of various parties and the Mexican-American cultural environment of East Los Angeles. In the end, Mary admits her feelings for Bruno and they kiss for the first time. Edward buys the house across from Aurelia and presents Nora the front door key, attached to an engagement ring. Family and friends are seen celebrating at Nora and Edward's street party wedding.

Cast

In addition, Alexis Ayala and  Pablo Cruz Guerrero play Nora and Mary's father Gabriel Dominguez Sr and their half-brother Gabe Jr, respectively.

Release
From Prada to Nada was released on Blu-ray and DVD May 3, 2011. , only 20% of the 20 reviews compiled on Rotten Tomatoes are positive, with an average rating of 4.08/10. Metacritic scored the film a 39, signifying "generally unfavorable reviews".

Accolades

References

External links

 
 
 
 
 
 

2011 films
2011 directorial debut films
2011 romantic comedy films
American romantic comedy films
Films about sisters
Films based on Sense and Sensibility
Films scored by Heitor Pereira
Films set in Los Angeles
Films shot in Mexico
Lionsgate films
Films about Mexican Americans
Odd Lot Entertainment films
2010s English-language films
2010s American films